2058 Róka, provisional designation , is a Themistian asteroid from the outer regions of the asteroid belt, approximately 22 kilometers in diameter.

It was discovered on 22 January 1938, by Hungarian György Kulin at Konkoly Observatory in Budapest, Hungary. The asteroid was named in memory of Hungarian science writer Gedeon Róka.

Classification and orbit 

Róka is a member of the Themis family, a dynamical family of carbonaceous outer-belt asteroids with nearly coplanar ecliptical orbits. It orbits the Sun at a distance of 2.7–3.6 AU once every 5 years and 6 months (2,016 days). Its orbit has an eccentricity of 0.15 and an inclination of 3° with respect to the ecliptic. The body's observation arc begins with its official discovery observation at Konkoly in 1938.

Physical characteristics 

Róka has been characterized as a carbonaceous C-type asteroid by Pan-STARRS photometric survey. Due to its ambivalent albedo it is also an assumed S-type asteroid.

Lightcurves 

In March 2005, a rotational lightcurve of Róka was obtained from photometric observations by French amateur astronomer René Roy. Lightcurve analysis gave a rotation period of 10.04 hours with a brightness variation of 0.34 magnitude. One month later, astronomer at the Rose-Hulman Observatory obtained another lightcurve with a concurring period of 10.09 hours and an amplitude of 0.40 magnitude.

Diameter and albedo 

According to the surveys carried out by the Infrared Astronomical Satellite IRAS, the Japanese Akari satellite, and the NEOWISE mission of NASA's Wide-field Infrared Survey Explorer, Róka measures between 21.36 and 24.273 kilometers in diameter and its surface has an albedo between 0.1196 and 0.1542. The Collaborative Asteroid Lightcurve Link derives an albedo of 0.0995 and calculates a diameter of 21.12 kilometers based on an absolute magnitude of 11.5.

Naming 

This minor planet was named in memory of Gedeon Róka (1906–1974), a Hungarian science writer and popularizer of astronomy from Budapest. The approved naming citation was published by the Minor Planet Center on 1 February 1980.

References

External links 
 Róka Gedeon (1906–1974), 
 Biography Róka Gedeon, incl. photography 
 Asteroid Lightcurve Database (LCDB), query form (info )
 Dictionary of Minor Planet Names, Google books
 Asteroids and comets rotation curves, CdR – Observatoire de Genève, Raoul Behrend
 Discovery Circumstances: Numbered Minor Planets (1)-(5000) – Minor Planet Center
 
 

 

002058
Discoveries by György Kulin
Named minor planets
19380122